Ten on One (The Singles) is the first greatest hits album by German singer Sandra, released on 15 October 1987 by Virgin Records. It was a commercial success and spawned one of Sandra's most successful singles, the cover of "Everlasting Love", originally recorded by Robert Knight.

Overview
The compilation consists of three songs from Sandra's debut studio album The Long Play (1985), five from her second studio album Mirrors (1986), and two new recordings: a cover version of "Everlasting Love" and "Stop for a Minute". Despite the title, the album includes the non-single track "Don't Cry (The Breakup of the World)" from Mirrors. The album was produced by Michael Cretu and Armand Volker. The album's booklet included short reminiscences for every track. A video version of the album was released on VHS, including nine music videos and a behind-the-scenes material.

"Everlasting Love" was released as the lead single from the album and became one of Sandra's most successful singles, reaching the top five in Germany, Greece and Switzerland. "Stop for a Minute" followed as the second and final single in early 1988, and reached the top 10 in Germany, as well as the top 20 in Switzerland and Denmark. The album itself reached the top 20 in Germany and Switzerland.

Track listing

Personnel
Credits adapted from the liner notes of Ten on One (The Singles).

 Sandra – lead vocals
 Michael Cretu – production, keyboards, programming, backing vocals
 Armand Volker – production 
 Marcus Löhr – electric guitars, acoustic guitars
 Hubert Kemmler – backing vocals
 Peter Ries – backing vocals
 Tissy Thiers – backing vocals
 Curt Cress – electronic percussion 
 Mats Björklund – additional guitars
 Peter Cornelius – additional guitars
 Mike Schmidt – cover
 Dieter Eikelpoth – photography

Charts

Certifications

References

1987 greatest hits albums
Albums produced by Michael Cretu
Sandra (singer) compilation albums
Virgin Records compilation albums